Christopher Charles Snopek (born September 20, 1970) is a former Major League Baseball infielder. He is an alumnus of the University of Mississippi.

Drafted by the Chicago White Sox in the 6th round of the  MLB amateur draft, Snopek would make his Major League Baseball debut with the Chicago White Sox on July 31, 1995, and appeared in his final game on September 27, 1998 for the Boston Red Sox.

External links
, or Retrosheet, or Pura Pelota (Venezuelan Winter League)

1970 births
Living people
Baseball players from Kentucky
Birmingham Barons players
Boston Red Sox players
Caribes de Oriente players
Chicago White Sox players
Indianapolis Indians players
Iowa Cubs players
Major League Baseball third basemen
Major League Baseball shortstops
Memphis Redbirds players
Nashville Sounds players
Ole Miss Rebels baseball players
Pawtucket Red Sox players
People from Cynthiana, Kentucky
Sarasota White Sox players
South Bend White Sox players
Tacoma Rainiers players
Tiburones de La Guaira players
American expatriate baseball players in Venezuela
Tigres de Aragua players
University of Mississippi alumni 
Utica Blue Sox players